Brendan Harrison (born 21 October 1992) is a Gaelic footballer who plays for Aghamore and the Mayo county team.

References

External links

1992 births
Living people
Aghamore Gaelic footballers
Gaelic football backs
Mayo inter-county Gaelic footballers